Rosina may refer to:
Rosina, Slovakia, a municipality in Slovakia
Rosina, Bulgaria, a village in Targovishte Municipality
Rosina, West Virginia
Rosina (given name), feminine given name
Rosina (surname)
Rosina (ship), list of ships with this name 
Rosina (opera), a light opera by the English composer William Shield
 985 Rosina, minor planet

See also
Rosine (disambiguation)